Brigitte Madlener is an Austrian para-alpine skier. She represented Austria at the 1980 Winter Paralympics and at the 1984 Winter Paralympics. In total, she won four gold medals and two silver medals at the Winter Paralympics.

Achievements

See also 
 List of Paralympic medalists in alpine skiing

References

External links 
 
 Lexikon Dornbirn - Madlener Brigitte

Living people
Year of birth missing (living people)
Place of birth missing (living people)
Paralympic alpine skiers of Austria
Alpine skiers at the 1980 Winter Paralympics
Alpine skiers at the 1984 Winter Paralympics
Medalists at the 1980 Winter Paralympics
Medalists at the 1984 Winter Paralympics
Paralympic gold medalists for Austria
Paralympic silver medalists for Austria
Austrian amputees
Austrian female alpine skiers
Paralympic medalists in alpine skiing
20th-century Austrian women